Lakshminarayana Temple may refer to several temples in Karnataka, India:
Lakshminarayana Temple, Adagur in Hassan district
Lakshminarayana Temple, Hosaholalu, in Mandya district